Terence Gaffney (born 9 March 1948) is an American mathematician who has made fundamental contributions to singularity theory – in particular, to the fields of singularities of maps and equisingularity theory.

Professional career
He is a Professor of Mathematics at Northeastern University. He did his undergraduate studies at Boston College. He received his Ph.D. from Brandeis University in 1975 under the direction of Edgar Henry Brown Jr. and Harold Levine. In 1975 he became an AMS Centennial Fellow at MIT and a year later he joined the Brown University faculty as Tamarkind instructor. In 1979 Gaffney became professor at Northeastern University where he has remained ever since. He has served as department chair, graduate director, chair of the undergraduate curriculum committee, and faculty senator.

Selected publications
.
.
.
.
.
.
.
.
.
.
.
.
.

See also
Mather-Gaffney criterion

References

1948 births
20th-century American mathematicians
21st-century American mathematicians
Algebraic geometers
Living people
Northeastern University faculty